Damhead Creek power station is a 792 MWe gas-fired power station in Kent, England, on the Hoo Peninsula. It is near the site of the decommissioned Kingsnorth power station.

History
Entergy, an American power firm, commissioned the plant. It was built by Raytheon Engineers and Constructor and Mitsubishi Heavy Industries, who provided the gas turbine equipment. The plant entered service in February 2001. The company trades as Damhead Creek Ltd.

On 2 June 2004, the plant was bought by Scottish Power for £317 million.
 
On 9 March 2009, Scottish Power announced plans to develop a second 1,000MW gas-fired power station adjacent to the current power station to be named Damhead Creek 2.

The plant was purchased and operated by Drax Generation Enterprise Ltd in 2018 before being sold to Vitol's VPI Holding in December 2020.

Specification
It is a CCGT type power station that uses natural gas. There are two Mitsubishi 701F gas turbines with the exhaust gas from each entering two (Dutch) NEM heat recovery steam generators. The steam from these enters one 216MWe Mitsubishi steam turbine. There are three hydrogen-cooled turbo generators: two on the gas turbines, and one on the steam turbine.

See also

 Salt End Power Station

References

External links

 Installation

Natural gas-fired power stations in England
Buildings and structures in Kent
Power stations in South East England